Inversoceras is a genus of cephalopods in the order Oncocerida and the family Trimeroceratidae. These mollusks were fast-moving nektobenthic carnivores. They lived in the Silurian period, from the Lower Wenlock age (428.2 ± 1.5 to 422.9 ± 2.8 mya) to the Ludlow age (422.9 ± 1.5 to 418.7 ± 2.8 mya).

Distribution
Silurian of Sweden, United States (Wisconsin).

Species
 Inversoceras falciformis (Barrande 1865)
 Inversoceras percurvatum Foerste 1926
 Inversoceras perversum eoperversum Stridsberg 1988
 Inversoceras perversum falciformis (Barrande 1865)
 Inversoceras perversum perversum (Barrande 1865)

See also
List of nautiloids

References
Biolib
Global Names
Paleobiology Database
Sepkoski, Jack Sepkoski's Online Genus Database
Sven Stridsberg Evolution Within the Silurian Cephalopod Genus Inversoceras

Prehistoric nautiloid genera